Beta-mannosidosis, also called lysosomal beta-mannosidase deficiency, is a disorder of oligosaccharide metabolism caused by decreased activity of the enzyme beta-mannosidase.  This enzyme is coded for by the gene MANBA, located at 4q22-25. Beta-mannosidosis is inherited in an autosomal recessive manner.  Affected individuals appear normal at birth, and can have a variable clinical presentation.  Infantile onset forms show severe neurodegeneration, while some children have intellectual disability.  Hearing loss and angiokeratomas are common features of the disease.

Symptoms and signs

The initial affected individual described in 1986 had a complex phenotype, and was later found to have both beta-mannosidosis and Sanfilippo syndrome.  People have been described with a wide spectrum of clinical presentations from infants and children with intellectual disability to adults who present with isolated skin findings (angiokeratomas).

Most cases are identified in the first year of life with respiratory infections, hearing loss and intellectual disability. Because of its rarity, and non-specific clinical findings, beta-mannosidosis can go undiagnosed until adulthood, where it can present with intellectual disability and behavioral problems, including aggression.

Cause
In terms of causation several mutations in the MANBA gene is the cause of beta-mannosidosis. The cytogenetic location of the gene is 4q24, furthermore the condition is inherited in an autosomal recessive manner

Mechanism

The  pathophysiology of this condition, is better comprehended, if one first looks at the normal function of beta-mannosidase such as its function of breaking down disaccharides

Beta-mannosidase function is consistent with, it being a lysosomal enzyme catalyzing and thus involved in degradation route for N-linked oligosaccharide moieties(glycoproteins)

Diagnosis

A diagnosis of beta-mannosidosis is suspected based on the persons clinical presentation.  Urine testing to identify abnormal oligosaccharides is a useful screening test, and enzymatic analysis or molecular testing can be used for confirmation.

Differential diagnosis
Diagnostic techniques for this condition can be done to offer a DDx, via lectin histochemistry to distinguish between α-mannosidosis and  beta-mannosidosis.

Treatment
In terms of beta-mannosidosis treatment there is none currently available, individuals that exhibit muscle weakness or seizures are treated based on the symptoms (since there's no cure)

See also
 Beta-mannosidase
 Alpha-mannosidosis

References

Further reading

External links

Glycoprotein metabolism disorders
Rare diseases
Autosomal recessive disorders